In enzymology, a chenodeoxycholoyltaurine hydrolase is an enzyme that catalyzes the chemical reaction

chenodeoxycholoyltaurine + H2O  chenodeoxycholate + taurine

Thus, the two substrates of this enzyme are chenodeoxycholoyltaurine and H2O, whereas its two products are chenodeoxycholate and taurine.

This enzyme belongs to the family of hydrolases, those acting on carbon-nitrogen bonds other than peptide bonds, specifically in linear amides.  The systematic name of this enzyme class is chenodeoxycholoyltaurine amidohydrolase. This enzyme participates in bile acid biosynthesis.

References

 

EC 3.5.1
Enzymes of unknown structure